John Noble (born 1948) is an Australian actor and theatre director.

John Noble may also refer to:
John Noble (MP), Member of Parliament for Old Sarum in 1417
John Willock Noble (1831–1912), U.S. Secretary of the Interior
John Noble (painter) (1874–1934), American post-Impressionist painter
John H. Noble (1923–2007), U.S.-born author, part owner of Praktica Camera company, survivor of Soviet concentration camps
John Noble (baritone) (1931–2008), English baritone
John Noble (bishop) (born 1944), Australian Anglican bishop
John Noble (rugby union), former South African rugby union player 
John Noble (Dean of Exeter), Dean of Exeter between 1274 and 1280
John Noble (publisher) (died 1797), bookseller and publisher in London
John Noble (cricketer) (1845–1889), English cricketer
John Noble (footballer) (born 1997), Australian rules footballer
John W. Noble (1880–1946), American film director and screenwriter
John A. Noble (1913–1983), artist
John Noble (jurist), Delaware lawyer and former judge on the Delaware Court of Chancery